Almost the entire Hindu community in Brunei is made up of people of Indian origin. The approximate size is a few thousand. There are two Hindu temples in Brunei. According to the 2001 census, 124 of the Hindus are citizens and another 91 are permanent residents. The rest are non-citizens.

Hinduism is practised by a minority of ethnic Tamils, which comprises mainly doctors, engineers working in Brunei and others working in the education sector, both at school and university or college level as professors and teachers as well as research personnel.

Gorkha Hindus
There is a Nepalese community in Seria, Belait in Brunei, made up of members of the British Army 's Brigade of Gurkhas. Historically, they have contributed in ensuring Brunei's autonomy

Brunei Hindu Welfare Board

Brunei's Hindu Welfare Board is a 50 year old Hindu religious organisation with approximately 3,000 members and there are two small Hindu temples in the country.

Hindu Temple
Though there are two Hindu temples, only one is officially registered under Brunei's government. The temple is located on the territory of the Gurkha Regiments in Seria, Brunei. This Hindu temple is visited for prayer by the local Hindu and Buddhist communities.

References

Brunei
Brunei
Religion in Brunei